Rai Vloet (born 8 May 1995) is a Dutch professional footballer who plays as an attacking midfielder for Russian club Ural Yekaterinburg.

Club career
Vloet was born in Schijndel. He made his professional debut as Jong PSV player in the second division on 20 September 2013 against FC Den Bosch coming on as a substitute in the 74th minute.

On 20 September 2016, while on loan at FC Eindhoven, Rai Vloet scored a goal in the 87th minute against FC Den Bosch, coached by his father Wiljan Vloet, to win 3–2 in the 2016–17 KNVB Cup. For the 2017–18 season he joined NAC Breda.

On 15 August 2018, after signing to Swiss club Chiasso, Vloet was bought by Italian side Frosinone. In January 2019, he left Frosinone by mutual consent.

On 4 February 2019, Vloet was signed by Belgian side Sint-Truiden as a free agent.

On 13 July 2019, he joined Eerste Divisie club Excelsior on a one-year contract with an option for another year.

On 22 June 2020, he joined Eredivisie club Heracles Almelo.

On 25 March 2022, FC Astana announced the signing of Vloet. On 6 September 2022, Astana announced that Vloet had moved to Ural Yekaterinburg after they had exercised a release clause in Vloet contract.

Personal life
Vloet was one of two men arrested on 14 November 2021 after the car in which both men were travelling was involved in a fatal collision with another vehicle on the A4 motorway near Hoofddorp that resulted in the death of a four-year-old boy. In January 2022, Vloet's club Heracles Almelo suspended him with immediate effect after being confronted with the police report by newspaper De Telegraaf. According to the police report, Vloet and the other man had stated that they did not drive the car. A breath test showed that Vloet had twice the permitted blood alcohol level and the on-board computer of Vloet's car showed that the driving speed was 203 kilometers per hour while the Netherlands has a speed limit of 130 km/h.

Career statistics

References

External links
 
 
 

1995 births
People from Schijndel
Footballers from North Brabant
Living people
Association football midfielders
Dutch footballers
Netherlands under-21 international footballers
Netherlands youth international footballers
Jong PSV players
PSV Eindhoven players
SC Cambuur players
FC Eindhoven players
NAC Breda players
FC Chiasso players
Frosinone Calcio players
Sint-Truidense V.V. players
Excelsior Rotterdam players
Heracles Almelo players
FC Astana players
FC Ural Yekaterinburg players
Eerste Divisie players
Eredivisie players
Serie A players
Belgian Pro League players
Kazakhstan Premier League players
Russian Premier League players
Dutch expatriate footballers
Dutch expatriate sportspeople in Switzerland
Expatriate footballers in Switzerland
Dutch expatriate sportspeople in Italy
Expatriate footballers in Italy
Dutch expatriate sportspeople in Belgium
Expatriate footballers in Belgium
Dutch expatriate sportspeople in Kazakhstan
Expatriate footballers in Kazakhstan
Dutch expatriate sportspeople in Russia
Expatriate footballers in Russia